Michel Decastel (born 22 October 1955) is a Swiss football manager and a former midfielder. He was most recently the manager of the Swiss Challenge League club Neuchâtel Xamax.

Honours

Player
Servette
Swiss Cup: 1983–84
Swiss Super League: 1984–85

Neuchâtel Xamax
Swiss Super Cup: 1988

Manager
FC Sion
Swiss Cup: 1995–96

References

External links

Michel Decastel at Footballdatabase

1955 births
Living people
Footballers from Geneva
Association football midfielders
Swiss men's footballers
Switzerland international footballers
Neuchâtel Xamax FCS players
Servette FC players
Ligue 1 players
RC Strasbourg Alsace players
Swiss football managers
FC Sion managers
Étoile Sportive du Sahel managers
Espérance Sportive de Tunis managers
Expatriate football managers in Egypt
Expatriate football managers in Tunisia
Expatriate football managers in Morocco
CS Sfaxien managers
Wydad AC managers
Zamalek SC managers
Yverdon-Sport FC managers
Botola managers